The 2016–17 season will be Debreceni VSC's 39th competitive season, 24nd consecutive season in the OTP Bank Liga and 114th year in existence as a football club.

First team squad 

 c

Transfers

Summer

In:

Out:

Winter

In:

Out:

List of Hungarian football transfers summer 2016
List of Hungarian football transfers winter 2016–17

Nemzeti Bajnokság I

References

External links
 Magyarfutball
 Official Website
 UEFA
 fixtures and results

Debreceni VSC seasons
Debrecen